The Yellow Snake is a 1926 thriller novel by the British writer Edgar Wallace.

It provided the basis for the 1963 West German film The Curse of the Yellow Snake directed by Franz Josef Gottlieb and starring Joachim Fuchsberger, Brigitte Grothum. It was made as part of a long-running series of Wallace adaptations during the decade.

References

Bibliography
 Bergfelder, Tim. International Adventures: German Popular Cinema and European Co-Productions in the 1960s. Berghahn Books, 2005.
 Goble, Alan. The Complete Index to Literary Sources in Film. Walter de Gruyter, 1999.

External links
 The Yellow Snake at Project Gutenberg Australia

1926 British novels
Novels by Edgar Wallace
British crime novels
British thriller novels
British novels adapted into films
Hodder & Stoughton books